Marcello Del Duca (born 31 August 1950 in Civitavecchia) is an Italian former water polo player who competed in the 1976 Summer Olympics.

See also
 List of Olympic medalists in water polo (men)
 List of World Aquatics Championships medalists in water polo

References

External links
 

1950 births
Living people
People from Civitavecchia
Italian male water polo players
Water polo players at the 1976 Summer Olympics
Olympic silver medalists for Italy in water polo
Medalists at the 1976 Summer Olympics
Sportspeople from the Metropolitan City of Rome Capital